i-Cable Communications Limited is Hong Kong telecommunications company owned by Forever Top (Asia) Limited, which acquired the company from The Wharf Group in 2017. Founded in 1999, the company provides broadband internet and pay-TV services. i-Cable also develops its fibre coaxial network (also used for the paid-TV service).

The broadband internet access service deploying cable modem based technology via the TCP/IP which is differed from the PPPoE technology provided by conventional carrier.

i-Cable also owns Hong Kong Cable Television, a cable television and Internet service provider, and Fantastic Television, a free-to-air television broadcaster.

External links 
 

Companies traded over-the-counter in the United States
Companies listed on the Hong Kong Stock Exchange
Internet service providers of Hong Kong
Companies formerly listed on the Nasdaq
Television stations in Hong Kong
The Wharf (Holdings)